The 2012 Family Circle Cup was a women's tennis event in the 2012 WTA Tour. It took place from March 31 to April 8, 2012. It was the 40th edition of the tournament and a Premier level tournament. The event was hosted at the Family Circle Tennis Center, on Daniel Island, Charleston, South Carolina, United States. It was the only event of the clay courts season played on green clay. The total prize money offered at this tournament was

Singles main draw entrants

Seeds

1 Rankings as of March 19, 2012

Other entrants 
The following players received wildcards into the main draw:
  Irina Falconi
  Jamie Hampton
  Anastasia Pavlyuchenkova
  Venus Williams

The following players received entry from the qualifying draw:
  Akgul Amanmuradova
  Iveta Benešová
  Jill Craybas
  Melinda Czink
  Mariana Duque-Mariño
  Camila Giorgi
  Mirjana Lučić
  Paula Ormaechea
  Melanie Oudin
  Karolína Plíšková
  Yaroslava Shvedova
  Stefanie Vögele

The following players received entry as lucky losers:
  Chan Yung-jan
  Andrea Hlaváčková

Withdrawals
  Irina-Camelia Begu (right elbow injury)
  Julia Görges (illness)
  Zheng Jie (low back injury)
  Ayumi Morita 
  Agnieszka Radwańska (back injury)
  Peng Shuai (right shoulder injury)

Retirements
  Jelena Dokić
  Sabine Lisicki (left ankle injury)

Doubles main draw entrants

Seeds

1 Rankings are as of March 19, 2012

Other entrants
The following pairs received wildcards into the doubles main draw:
  Emily J. Harman /  Simone Kalhorn
  Anastasia Pavlyuchenkova /  Lucie Šafářová

Champions

Singles

 Serena Williams def.  Lucie Šafářová 6–0, 6–1.
It was Serena's 40th career singles title and her 4th overall on clay.

Doubles

 Anastasia Pavlyuchenkova /  Lucie Šafářová def.  Anabel Medina Garrigues /  Yaroslava Shvedova, 5–7, 6–4, [10–6]

References

External links
 Official website

Family Circle Cup
Charleston Open
Family Circle Cup
Family Circle Cup
Family Circle Cup
Family Circle Cup